Probianus may refer to:

 Petronius Probianus (fl. 315–331 AD), a Roman consul and praefectus urbi
 Rufius Probianus (fl. 400), a vicarius
 Caelius Aconius Probianus (fl. 461–471), a praetorian prefect and consul